Wing Commander Mohammed Ndatsu Umaru was a Military Governor of Kwara State, Nigeria from August 1985 to December 1987, and then of Kano State from December 1987 to July 1988 during the military regime of General Ibrahim Babangida.

Early life 
On June 21, 1986, he opened a newly completed building in Ilorin, Kwara State to house the state secretariat of the Nigeria Union of Journalists. The building was scheduled to be demolished in July 2009 to make space for parking during a planned one-day visit by President Umaru Yar'Adua.

In October 1986 he arranged for large-scale distribution of grain to Kano State farmers whose crops had been destroyed by pests.
As governor of Kano State, in 1988 Group Captain Mohammed Ndatsu Umaru set up committees that toured the state, held public hearings and prepared recommendations on laws and policies to address social problems.

References

Nigerian Air Force officers
Living people
1950 births
Governors of Kano State
Governors of Kwara State